Ernst Köpf Jr. (born 24 June 1968) is a German ice hockey player. He competed in the men's tournament at the 1992 Winter Olympics.

His father Ernst Köpf Sr. won a bronze medal in ice hockey at the 1976 Winter Olympics.

References

External links
 
 
 
 

1968 births
Living people
Olympic ice hockey players of Germany
Ice hockey players at the 1992 Winter Olympics
Sportspeople from Augsburg
German ice hockey left wingers